Nikola Tonev (born November 12, 1985) is a Macedonian retired football defender, who last played for Kit-Go Pehčevo.

Club career
He joined Vardar from hometown club Bregalnica in 2006.

In 2011, Tonev moved to Russian side Volgar. He made his debut in the FNL for FC Volgar-Gazprom Astrakhan on May 15, 2011 in a game against FC Chernomorets Novorossiysk.

Controversy
On 6 August 2014, Tonev was found guilty by the KFF Control & Disciplinary Committee of providing false documents which showed he was a Kazakhstani citizen. He was subsequently fined 500,000₸ (€2100) and banned from participating in Kazakh football for life. His club, FC Tobol, were fined 700,000₸ and deducted 3 points in the Kazakhstan Premier League.

References

1985 births
Living people
Sportspeople from Štip
Association football defenders
Macedonian footballers
North Macedonia under-21 international footballers
FK Vardar players
KF Shkëndija players
FK Baník Most players
FC Taraz players
FC Volgar Astrakhan players
FC Zhetysu players
FC Tobol players
FK Bregalnica Štip players
Macedonian First Football League players
Czech First League players
Kazakhstan Premier League players
Russian First League players
Macedonian Second Football League players
Macedonian expatriate footballers
Expatriate footballers in the Czech Republic
Macedonian expatriate sportspeople in the Czech Republic
Expatriate footballers in Kazakhstan
Macedonian expatriate sportspeople in Kazakhstan
Expatriate footballers in Russia
Macedonian expatriate sportspeople in Russia